Finding Yingying is an 2020 American documentary film directed and produced by Jiayan "Jenny" Shi about the disappearance of college student Yingying Zhang and her family's search to find her.

The film had its world premiere at the Middlebury New Filmmakers Festival on August 27, 2020. It was released on December 11, 2020, by MTV Documentary Films.

Synopsis
Yingying Zhang, a college student studying in the United States from China, has mysteriously disappeared after getting into a car. Her family arrives from China distraught looking for answers to discover she has been murdered, as they fight for justice and to bring their daughter's remains back home.

Release
The film was initially set to have its world premiere at South by Southwest in March 2020, however, the festival was cancelled due to the COVID-19 pandemic. The film won the Special Jury Prize for Best Documentary Feature.
Instead, the film had its world premiere at the Middlebury New Filmmakers Festival on August 27, 2020. In October 2020, MTV Documentary Films acquired U.S. distribution rights to the film. It also screened at DOC NYC on November 11, 2020. It was released on December 11, 2020.

Reception

Critical reception
Finding Yingying positive reviews from film critics. The site's critical consensus reads, "A compassionate look at a missing person's case, Finding Yingyings touching sincerity will resonate with audiences thanks to its elevated storytelling."

References

External links
 
 

2020 films
American documentary films
2020 documentary films
Documentary films about crime in the United States
MTV Films films
2020s American films